Nicolae Daniel Balauru (born 6 December 1980) is a Romanian former footballer who played as a midfielder for teams such as Rulmentul Alexandria, Poli AEK Timişoara, Oțelul Galați or CSM Râmnicu Vâlcea, among others.

His brother, Dragoș Balauru is also a footballer.

References

External links
 

1980 births
Living people
People from Alexandria, Romania
Romanian footballers
Association football midfielders
Liga I players
Liga II players
AFC Rocar București players
FC Politehnica Timișoara players
CSM Unirea Alba Iulia players
ASC Oțelul Galați players
FCM Bacău players
FC Unirea Urziceni players
CS Mioveni players
CS Otopeni players
SCM Râmnicu Vâlcea players
FC Metaloglobus București players
AS Voința Snagov players